Jacob Benjamin Mühlrad (born 9 April 1991) is a Swedish composer. His works have been performed at Carnegie Hall in New York and National Portrait Gallery in London. Mühlrad is the youngest composer to have gotten a piece performed at The Royal Swedish Opera.

Biography 
Mühlrad started with music when he was 15 years old and found an old broken synth and started to improvise with it. As a result of severe dyslexia he initially had difficulties learning how to read and write sheet music. He studied music under Sven-David Sandström and then went on to the Royal College of Music in Stockholm and has a master's degree from the Royal College of Music in London.

In 2016 Mühlrad made his Carnegie Hall debut with his work ”Pan”, inspired by the god in Greek mythology with the same name. Mühlrad has produced work for Berwaldhallen, the Swedish Radio Choir, the Royal Stockholm Philharmonic Orchestra and the Swedish Radio Symphony Orchestra.

As the grandchild of a Holocaust survivor he was awarded a scholarship from Micael Bindefeld's Foundation in memory of the Holocaust ($33 000) on the International Holocaust Remembrance Day in 2017. The scholarship funded the production for an a capella choir piece with the Radio Choir and Eva Dahlgren based on his grandfather, Michael Bliman's, experiences in Auschwitz and Bergen-Belsen.

Mühlrad is also a co-composer on rapper Silvana Imam's Swedish Grammy nominated album ”Naturkraft” (2016).

In 2014 Mühlrad performed collaborative and experimental concert Through and Through, with Swedish contemporary artist Andreas Emenius, at R1 Reaktorhallen in Stockholm.

In 2018, it was announced that Mühlrad was producing a piece that was co-commissioned by several of Europe's most prominent choirs: the Radio Choir in Cologne, Cappella San Francisco, Tapiola Chamber Choir in Espoo, Finland and the Swedish Radio Choir.

In 2019, it was confirmed that Mühlrad would be composing an orchestral interpretation of One (Your Name) by the Swedish House Mafia for the trio's comeback tour which is starting with three Stockholm shows in May. The piece, entitled "One Symphony", was released globally on January 1, 2022.

References 

Living people
1991 births
Swedish composers
Swedish male composers
21st-century Swedish musicians
21st-century Swedish male musicians
Royal College of Music, Stockholm alumni
Alumni of the Royal College of Music
21st-century composers